The 1939 The Citadel Bulldogs football team represented The Citadel, The Military College of South Carolina in the 1939 college football season.  Tatum Gressette served as head coach for the eighth season.  The Bulldogs played as members of the Southern Conference and played home games at Johnson Hagood Stadium.

Schedule

NFL Draft selection

References

Citadel Bulldogs
The Citadel Bulldogs football seasons
Citadel football